Amaury Epaminondas Junqueira (25 December 1935 – 31 March 2016) was a Brazilian football forward who played for Brazilian club San Paolo and for several Mexicans clubs.

Palmarès

Club 
São Paulo
Campeonato Paulista: 1957

Oro de Jalisco
Liga MX: 1962-63

Toluca
Liga MX: 1966-67, 1967-68

Individual 
Liga MX top scorer: 1962-63, 1964–65, 1966–67

References

External links
  Profile and Statistics on Once-onze.narod.ru

1935 births
2016 deaths
Brazilian footballers
Brazilian expatriate footballers
Association football forwards
Atlas F.C. footballers
Deportivo Toluca F.C. players
São Paulo FC players
Liga MX players
Expatriate footballers in Mexico
People from Barretos